A fanfare is a flourish of music for brass instruments.

Fanfare may also refer to:

Music
 Fanfare Records, a former British record label
 Fanfares (album), a 2012 album by GoGo Penguin
 Fanfare (Skids album) (1982)
 Fanfare (Jonathan Wilson album) (2013)
 "Fanfare" (Davichi song)
 "Fanfare" (song), a 2020 single by Twice
 "Fanfare", a 2018 track by Toby Fox from Deltarune Chapter 1 OST from the video game Deltarune
 Fanfare (magazine), an American classical music magazine

Other uses
 Fanfare (ballet), a 1953 ballet by Jerome Robbins
 Fanfare (company), a former American technology company
 Fanfare (decoy), a torpedo decoy
 Fanfare (film), a 1958 Dutch comedy film
 French destroyer Fanfare
 Fanfare, a sculpture by Neil Dawson

See also
 Fanfare band, a musical ensemble composed of percussion instruments, bugles, natural horns and natural trumpets
 Fanfare trumpet, a long trumpet build